Jerry Siegel and Joe Shuster created Superman; there are other contributors to Superman.

Creators of Superman
 Jerry Siegel — co-creator, writer. Co-created several secondary characters including Lois Lane, Alexander Joseph "Lex" Luthor, Perry White, James Bartholomew "Jimmy" Olsen, Jonathan and Martha Kent, Jor-El, Lara Lor-Van, Mr. Mxyzptlk, Lena Luthor and George Taylor, among others. 
 Joe Shuster — co-creator, artist. Co-created several secondary characters including Lois Lane,  Alexander Joseph "Lex" Luthor, Perry White, James Bartholomew "Jimmy" Olsen, Jonathan and Martha Kent, Jor-El, Lara Lor-Van, Mr. Mxyzptlk and George Taylor, among others.

Notable contributors

Writers and artists
The following list is of people who have both written and drawn Superman comics.

Writers only

Artists only

See also
 List of Batman creators
 List of Wonder Woman creators
 List of Green Lantern creators

Lists of comics creators
Creators